Helle Nielsen (born 20 July 1981) is a Danish badminton player. In 1999, she won a silver and two bronzes at the European Junior Badminton Championships in Glasgow, Scotland in the girls doubles, mixed doubles and mixed team respectively.
In 2008, she won the bronze medal at the European Championships in mixed doubles with Carsten Mogensen.

Achievements

European Championships 
Mixed doubles

European Junior Championships 
Mixed doubles

Mixed doubles

BWF Grand Prix 
The BWF Grand Prix has two level such as Grand Prix and Grand Prix Gold. It is a series of badminton tournaments, sanctioned by Badminton World Federation (BWF) since 2007.

Women's doubles

Mixed doubles

 BWF Grand Prix Gold tournament
 BWF & IBF Grand Prix tournament

BWF International Challenge/Series
Women's doubles

Mixed doubles

 BWF International Challenge tournament
 BWF International Series tournament

References

External links
Helle Nielsen's Profile - Badminton.dk

Living people
1981 births
People from Brøndby Municipality
Danish female badminton players
Sportspeople from the Capital Region of Denmark